Pennsylvania's Auditor General election was held November 2, 2004. Necessary primary elections were held on April 27, 2004, with both major party candidates running unopposed. Democrat Jack Wagner, a state senator from Pittsburgh, was elected auditor general; he had previously been the endorsed Democratic candidate for lieutenant governor in 2002, but was upset by Catherine Baker Knoll. The Republican candidate was Joe Peters, a Department of Justice official who was well known for prosecuting Philadelphia mafia boss Nicodemo "Little Nicky" Scarfo.

General election

References

2004 Pennsylvania elections
2004
November 2004 events in the United States
2004 United States state auditor elections